Linear motion, also called rectilinear motion, is one-dimensional motion along a straight line, and can therefore be described mathematically using only one spatial dimension. The linear motion can be of two types: uniform linear motion, with constant velocity (zero acceleration); and non-uniform linear motion, with variable velocity (non-zero acceleration). An example of linear motion is an athlete running a 100-meter dash along a straight track.

Linear motion is the most basic of all motion. According to Newton's first law of motion, objects that do not experience any net force will continue to move in a straight line with a constant velocity until they are subjected to a net force. Under everyday circumstances, external forces such as gravity and friction can cause an object to change the direction of its motion, so that its motion cannot be described as linear.

One may compare linear motion to general motion. In general motion, a particle's position and velocity are described by vectors, which have a magnitude and direction. In linear motion, the directions of all the vectors describing the system are equal and constant which means the objects move along the same axis and do not change direction. The analysis of such systems may therefore be simplified by neglecting the direction components of the vectors involved and dealing only with the magnitude.

Displacement

The motion in which all the particles of a body move through the same distance in the same time is called translatory motion. There are two types of translatory motions: rectilinear motion; curvilinear motion. Since linear motion is a motion in a single dimension, the distance traveled by an object in particular direction is the same as displacement. The SI unit of displacement is the metre.

The equivalent of displacement in rotational motion is the angular displacement  measured in radians.
The displacement of an object cannot be greater than the distance because it is also a distance but the shortest one. Consider a person travelling to work daily. Overall displacement when he returns home is zero, since the person ends up back where he started, but the distance travelled is clearly not zero.

Velocity

Velocity refers to a displacement in one direction with respect to an interval of time. It is defined as the rate of change of displacement over change in time. Velocity is a vectorial quantity, representing a direction and a magnitude of movement. The magnitude of a velocity is called speed. The SI unit of speed is  that is metre per second.

Average velocity
The average velocity of a moving body is its total displacement divided by the total time needed to reach a body from the initial point to the final point. It is an estimated velocity for a distance to travel. Mathematically, it is given by:

where:
 is the time at which the object was at position  and
 is the time at which the object was at position 
The magnitude of the average velocity  is called an average speed.

Instantaneous velocity
In contrast to an average velocity, referring to the overall motion in a finite time interval, the instantaneous velocity of an object describes the state of motion at a specific point in time. It is defined by letting the length of the time interval  tend to zero, that is, the velocity is the time derivative of the displacement as a function of time.

The magnitude of the instantaneous velocity  is called the instantaneous speed.

Acceleration

Acceleration is defined as the rate of change of velocity with respect to time. Acceleration is the second derivative of displacement i.e. acceleration can be found by differentiating position with respect to time twice or differentiating velocity with respect to time once.

Jerk

The rate of change of acceleration, the third derivative of displacement is known as jerk. In the UK jerk is also known as jolt.

Jounce

The rate of change of jerk, the fourth derivative of displacement is known as jounce.

Equations of kinematics

In case of constant acceleration, the four physical quantities acceleration, velocity, time and displacement can be related by using the equations of motion

here,
 is the initial velocity        
 is the final velocity          
 is the acceleration                
 is the displacement
 is the time

These relationships can be demonstrated graphically. The gradient of a line on a displacement time graph represents the velocity. The gradient of the velocity time graph gives the acceleration while the area under the velocity time graph gives the displacement. The area under a graph of acceleration versus time is equal to the change in velocity.

Analogy with circular motion

In contrast, the centripetal acceleration, is perpendicular to the motion.

The following table shows the analogy in derived SI units:

See also
 Angular motion
 Centripetal force
 Inertial frame of reference
 Linear actuator
 Linear bearing
 Linear motor
 Mechanics of planar particle motion
 Motion graphs and derivatives
 Reciprocating motion
 Rectilinear propagation
 Uniformly accelerated linear motion

References

Further reading 
 Resnick, Robert and Halliday, David (1966), Physics, Chapter 3  (Vol I and II, Combined edition), Wiley International Edition, Library of Congress Catalog Card No. 66-11527
 Tipler P.A., Mosca G., "Physics for Scientists and Engineers", Chapter 2 (5th edition), W. H. Freeman and company: New York and Basing stoke, 2003.

External links

 
Classical mechanics